Bhareh is a town in Etawah district in the state of Uttar Pradesh, India. This is situated on the confluence of Yamuna and Chambal rivers. There is an old fort belonging to the Sengar clan.This is the heroic place of Sengar Rajputs. Sengar dynasty Kanardhani Maharajadhiraj Vishok Dev was married to Devkala, sister of Maharaja Jaichand Gaharwar (Rathore) of Kannauj. The last Raja of Bhareh was Raja Niranjan Singh Judeo (present Maharaja Annirudh Singh Judeo) who was also a Freedom Fighter. He was also an avid flyer and one of the few at that time to have obtained a flying licence. He died in 1991. His eldest son was late Amar Singhji who died in 2004.Singh. Amar Singhji's brother is Krishna Chandra Singh Sengar, who has now settled in Noida, and lives with his spouse, Malti Sengar. Krishna Sengar has 2 children, Ashvini Sengar and Malvika Sengar (now Malvika Katoch). Ashvini Sengar (spouse - Manjari Senger) has 3 children: Anjali Sengar, Aniket Sengar and Anugrah Sengar. Malvika Katoch (married to Pankaj Katoch), has 2 children: Aditya Katoch and Niharika Katoch.

Cities and towns in Auraiya district